Santa Rita Park (Santa Rita, Spanish for "Saint Rita") is an unincorporated community in Merced County, California.

The Santa Rita Park post office opened in 1940. In 1966 it moved west to Dos Palos Y.

References

Unincorporated communities in California
Unincorporated communities in Merced County, California